Erin O'Brien-Moore (born Annette O'Brien-Moore, May 2, 1902 – May 3, 1979) was an American actress. She created the role of Rose in the original Broadway production of Elmer Rice's Pulitzer Prize-winning play, Street Scene (1929), and was put under contract in Hollywood and made a number of films in the 1930s. Her promising career on the stage and screen was interrupted by severe injuries she sustained in a 1939 fire. Following her recovery and extensive plastic surgery she returned to the stage and character roles in films and television, including four seasons of the primetime serial drama Peyton Place (1965–68).

Biography

Early life and beginning in the theater 
O'Brien-Moore was born in Los Angeles, to J.B.L. and Agnes O'Brien-Moore. Her father was publisher of the Tucson Citizen; her older brother was classical scholar Ainsworth O'Brien-Moore. She was educated at a convent in Arizona, and planned to become a painter until she saw Alla Nazimova on the stage, when she turned her attention to the theatre. She first appeared on Broadway in 1926 as a maid in The Makropoulos Secret. In 1928, O'Brien-Moore played the female lead in E.E. Cummings' Him at the Provincetown Playhouse. She was the star of Elmer Rice's Street Scene (1929), a naturalistic drama about life in a New York City tenement that ran for 601 performances on Broadway, toured throughout the United States, and received the Pulitzer Prize. During the play's six-month run in London, Aldous Huxley became an ardent fan of O'Brien-Moore and saw her performance at least three times.

Career in Hollywood 

O'Brien-Moore's stage success led to a Hollywood contract and second-lead roles in films, including Black Legion (1937) with Humphrey Bogart. In The Life of Emile Zola (1937), with Paul Muni, she played the character who inspired the fictional character Nana. Her other films include Dangerous Corner (1934), Little Men (1934), His Greatest Gamble (1934), Seven Keys to Baldpate (1935), Streamline Express (1935), Our Little Girl (1935), Two in the Dark (1936), The Ex-Mrs. Bradford (1936), Ring Around the Moon (1936), The Leavenworth Case (1936), Green Light (1937) and The Plough and the Stars (1937).

Described by The New York Times as "a slender, dark-haired woman with fragile, beautiful features", O'Brien-Moore had a rising career that was interrupted by severe injuries she suffered January 22, 1939 in a fire. After she recovered from the accident, O'Brien-Moore resumed her acting career on radio, including Big Sister.

After extensive plastic surgery, O'Brien-Moore returned to the stage and resumed her career in films and television. In 1948, she performed on Kraft Television Theatre and in The Philco Television Playhouse presentation, "Street Scene". She took the role of Anna, and Betty Field played Rose, the role that O'Brien-Moore had created on the stage.

She co-starred with Charlie Ruggles in the situation comedy The Ruggles (1950–52), and in series including NBC Presents, General Electric Theater, Lux Video Theater, Alfred Hitchcock Presents, and Perry Mason ("The Case of the Deadly Verdict"). She portrayed Miss Kelly in the 1961 pilot episode, "The Return," of the series Window on Main Street (1961–62), appeared in a 1965 episode of Kentucky Jones and played the role of Nurse Esther Choate in the TV version of Peyton Place for four seasons (1965–68). 

Her later feature films include Destination Moon (1950), The Family Secret (1951), Sea of Lost Ships (1954), Phantom of the Rue Morgue (1954), Peyton Place (1957) and How to Succeed in Business Without Really Trying (1967).

Personal life and last years 
O'Brien-Moore was married to Mark Barron, drama editor of the Associated Press in 1936. Their 10-year marriage ended in divorce.

O'Brien-Moore died of cancer on May 3, 1979 at the Motion Picture Country Hospital in Los Angeles.

Filmography

References

External links

 
 
 Erin O'Brien Moore Papers, circa 1910–1950 #4069, Southern Historical Collection, The Wilson Library, University of North Carolina at Chapel Hill

1902 births
1979 deaths
Actresses from Los Angeles
American film actresses
American stage actresses
American television actresses
Deaths from cancer in California
20th-century American actresses